The Hawking energy or Hawking mass is one of the possible definitions of mass in general relativity.  It is a measure of the bending of ingoing and outgoing rays of light that are orthogonal to a 2-sphere surrounding the region of space whose mass is to be defined.

Definition 
Let  be a 3-dimensional sub-manifold of a relativistic spacetime, and let  be a closed 2-surface.

Properties 

In the Schwarzschild metric, the Hawking mass of any sphere  about the central mass is equal to the value  of the central mass.

A result of Geroch implies that Hawking mass satisfies an important monotonicity condition. In particular, if  is a family of connected surfaces evolving according to

Said otherwise, Hawking mass is increasing for the inverse mean curvature flow.

Hawking mass is not necessarily positive. However, it is asymptotic to the ADM or the Bondi mass, depending on whether the surface is asymptotic to spatial infinity or null infinity.

See also

Mass in general relativity
Inverse mean curvature flow

References

Further reading
Section 6.1 in 

General relativity